Solanilla (Albacete) is a village in Albacete, Castile-La Mancha, Spain. 

Populated places in the Province of Albacete